is a railway station located in the central district of the town of Noheji in Aomori Prefecture, Japan. The station has been operating since 1891.  Since 2010, the station has been jointly operated by the East Japan Railway Company (JR East) and the Aoimori Railway Company, a third sector, regional rail operator. The station is the southern terminus of JR East's Ōminato Line and was formerly the northern terminus of the Nanbu Jūkan Railway.

Location
It is also the southern terminus of the Ōminato Line.

Aomori Prefectural Noheji High School

Station layout
Noheji Station has a single ground-level side platform and two ground-level island platforms serving five tracks, connected by a footbridge. The station building has a staffed ticket office, as well as an automatic ticket machine.

Platforms

History
Noheiji Station was opened on 1 September 1891 as a station of the Nippon Railway. It was nationalized on 1 July 1906 and became a station of the Japanese Government Railways Tōhoku Main Line. On 20 March 1921, it became the southern terminus of the Ōminato Line. After the end of World War II, the JGR became the Japanese National Railways (JNR).

On 15 March 1954 an F-84 Thunderjet from nearby Misawa Air Base crashed on top of Noheji Station, destroying the station building and killing twelve people. The explosion left a crater three meters wide and two meters deep, and set fire to one of the carriages of the Tōhoku Main Line. Platforms 1 through 3 were also destroyed. The pilot ejected, but his parachute failed to open and he was also killed.

From 5 August 1968, the Nanbu Jūkan Railway began operations from Noheji (operations ended in 1997). With the privatization of JNR on 1 April 1987, it came under the operational control of JR East.

Services
The station is primarily served by trains operating on Aomori–Hachinohe and Noheji–Ōminato local services. Passenger trains serve Noheji Station just under 17 hours a day from 6:24am to 11:06pm. At peak hours between the first train and 9:04am trains depart from the station roughly every 30 minutes; otherwise trains depart at an approximate hourly basis. 

In 2018, the station was used by a daily average of 294 passengers daily riding on the Ōminato Line. In the same year, the Aoimori Railway Line saw an average daily ridership of 2,068 passengers, making it the second busiest station along the line, excluding Aomori and Hachinohe stations.. The total number of passengers utilizing the station between the two lines in 2018 was 2,362, an increase from the 2010 daily average of 673 passengers when the station was still fully operated by JR East.

Bus services
 Enburi; For Shinjuku Station and Tokyo Station

See also
List of railway stations in Japan

References

External links

Noheji Station (Aoimori Railway) 
Noheji Station (JR East) 

Railway stations in Aomori Prefecture
Ōminato Line
Railway stations in Japan opened in 1881
Noheji, Aomori
Aoimori Railway Line
Nanbu Jūkan Railway